This is a table of 1962 United States Tri-Service aircraft designation system with selected letter sequences and number. Two previous USAF/AAF/AAC number series are included due to their impact and partial incorporation into the tri-service system (A, B, C, F and O reset to one, but # carryover existed).

Key: Rows are by number and columns are by single letter designation with unique number series. Selected double letter designation are linked but with parentheses, when their primary letter is of that series (not modified mission or status prefix modifiers), there is non non pre-fixed aircraft, or if there several multiple mission/status versions. If aircraft was originally designated in an earlier system it is marked with an asterisk * (either renamed, or, all or part of designation adopted into new system after '62). Strikethrough is for designations which were changed or canceled (e.g. aircraft changed to new one). Skipped on purpose (unused) or retired before '62 is marked with a ^ and simply unused with a dash – . Aircraft designated after 1962 that continue (or appear to continue) pre-'62 number series are marked #.

Note: KC-767 was allocated out of sequence for Boeing 767 tanker derivative (not KC-46 Pegasus) and is not included in list due to hundreds of C-series design numbers being skipped.

United States military aircraft
United States DoD aircraft designations